Kenneth A. "Ike" Petersen (July 8, 1909 – August 6, 1995) was an American football running back who played two seasons in the National Football League with the Chicago Cardinals and Detroit Lions. He played college football at Gonzaga University. His last name is sometimes misspelled as "Peterson".

References

External links
Just Sports Stats

1909 births
1995 deaths
Players of American football from Indiana
American football running backs
Gonzaga Bulldogs football players
Chicago Cardinals players
Detroit Lions players